Stilbina is a genus of moths of the family Noctuidae.

Species
 Stilbina hypaenides Staudinger, 1892
 Stilbina koreana Draudt, 1934
 Stilbina numida (Oberthür, 1890)
 Stilbina olympica Dierl & Povolny 1970

References
Natural History Museum Lepidoptera genus database
Stilbina at funet

Hadeninae